William James Müller  (28 June 18128 September 1845), also spelt Muller, was a British landscape and figure painter, the best-known artist of the Bristol School.

Life
Müller was born at Bristol, the son of J. S. Müller, a Prussian from Danzig, curator of a museum in Bristol. He first studied painting under James Baker Pyne. His early pictures were mostly of the scenery of Gloucestershire and Wales, and he learned much from his study of Claude, Ruysdael, and earlier landscape-painters. He witnessed the 1831 Bristol riots and recorded some of the scenes in a series of "raw and brilliant oil and watercolour sketches". In 1833 he exhibited at the Royal Academy for the first time, showing   Destruction of Old London Bridge-Morning. The next year he made a tour through France, Switzerland and Italy.

He visited the Middle East twice. The first visit was in 1838-39 when he visited Athens, and travelled onwards to Alexandria and Cairo, where he spent two weeks before continuing up the Nile to Luxor, where he made drawings of the ruins and landscapes before returning to Cairo in mid-January.   Shortly after his return he left Bristol and settled in London, where he exhibited regularly. 
His scenes of Egyptian streets and market proved especially popular. His journey was at the request of the archaeologist Charles Fellows – but at his own expense – Müller and his pupil Harry Johnson  accompanied the government expedition to Lycia. He spent three months sketching the landscape and local people around Xanthus, Pinara and Tlos. He spent most of the rest of his life, after his return to England, working on watercolours, and a few oils, of Lycian subjects. The work he carried out at Lycia is considered to be among his finest.

In 1840 he again visited France, where he executed a series of sketches of Renaissance architecture, twenty-five of which were lithographed and published in 1841, in a folio entitled  The Age of Francis I. of France.

He died at Bristol on 8 September 1845. Following his death, his work was in great demand; leading to the production of a considerable number of fakes.  A biography by Nathaniel Neal Solly was published in 1875.

Muller is buried in the Unitarian burial ground, Brunswick Cemetery, off Brunswick Square, Bristol. His grave is marked by a simple polished black stone slab inscribed "Sacred to the memory of William James Muller who died Sep 8th 1845 Aged 35 years".  His age, as given in the inscription is contrary to the burial records which record it as 33. The current tomb stone may be relatively modern, as the grave was recorded as being unmarked on a 1970s survey. A bust of the painter is located at the entrance to the cloister in Bristol Cathedral.

The British Museum was bequeathed a rich collection of Müller's sketches by John Henderson. Biographies of Müller have been written by Solly (1875), Bunt (1948) and Greenacre and Stoddard (1991).

Publications
William James Müller, Muller's sketches of the age of Francis the First, 26 large and fine tinted drawings on stone of splendid Architecture and Picturesque Old Buildings in France (H. Graves, 1841)

See also
Royal West of England Academy

Notes

Further reading
Nathaniel Neal Solly, Memoir of the life of William James Müller, a native of Bristol, landscape and figure painter: with original letters and an account of his travels and of his principal works (London: Chapman & Hall, 1875) 369 pp.
Cyril George Eduard Bunt, The Life and Art of William James Müller of Bristol (Leigh-on-Sea: E. Lewis, 1948)
Francis Greenacre & Sheena Stoddard, W.J. Müller, 1812-1845 (Friends of Bristol Art Gallery for Bristol Museums and Art Gallery, 1991), 176 pp., 
William James Müller 1812-1845: Exhibition to commemorate the 150th anniversary of Müller's birth held at the City Art Gallery Bristol October 18 - November 24th 1962 (City & County of Bristol, 1962)
William Müller, 1812-1845: Tate Gallery, 12 November 198431 March 1985 (Tate Gallery, 1984) 6 pp.

External links

 

1812 births
1845 deaths
19th-century English painters
Artists from Bristol
English male painters
Orientalist painters
19th-century English male artists